Flavitalea gansuensis is a Gram-negative and rod-shaped bacterium from the genus of Flavitalea which has been isolated from soil from ab arid area from the Gansu Province in China.

References

External links
Type strain of Flavitalea gansuensis at BacDive -  the Bacterial Diversity Metadatabase

Chitinophagia
Bacteria described in 2013